Josef Anton von Gegenbaur (6 March 1800, in Wangen, Württemberg – 31 January 1876, in Rome) was an accomplished German historical and portrait painter.

Biography
He studied first at the Royal Academy in Munich under Robert von Langer, remaining in that city from 1815 to 1823. Among his productions there were two idyllic works, a "Saint Sebastian" and a "Madonna and Child", altar-piece for his native town. In 1823 the painter went to Rome, where he remained until 1826, studying especially the works of Raphael. He became successful as a fresco painter, and, on his return to Württemberg, the king made him court painter and commissioned him to decorate the Royal Villa of Schloss Rosenstein. In 1829 Gegenbaur went again to Rome and worked on frescoes.

During later residence in Stuttgart he was employed from 1836 to 1854 in decorating the royal Palace with sixteen scenes in fresco from the history of Württemberg. These include incidents in the life of Count Eberhard II of Württemberg. In the same building are many of his oil paintings, among them being "Two Shepherds", "Adam and Eve after their expulsion from Eden", and "Moses Striking the Rock". In the Stuttgart Gallery is also his "Hercules and Omphale". His other paintings in oil, ranging in date from 1829 to 1860 include many on mythological subjects: "Sleeping Venus and Two Satyrs", "Leda and the Swan" "Apollo and the Muses", "Bacchus and Ariadne", "Venus and Cupid", "Ceres and Jason", "Aeolus Aeola", "Pluto and Proserpine", "Neptune and Thetis", several Genii and Amorettes, and some portraits. Among Gegenbaur's frescoes, in addition to those already mentioned, are "Jupiter giving Immortality to Psyche", "The Marriage of Cupid and Psyche", four scenes from the life of Psyche, "The Four Seasons", an "Aurora"—all at the Schloss Rosenstein. In addition to these works, we may mention, as well as various Madonnas, "The Ascension of the Virgin", "The Crucifixion", "Hercules and Omphale", the last in the Thorwaldsen Museum in Copenhagen.

See also
 List of German painters

Sources

External links

1800 births
1876 deaths
19th-century German painters
19th-century German male artists
German male painters
Court painters
Academy of Fine Arts, Munich alumni